The Irish Association of Physicists in Medicine (IAPM) is the Irish learned society for physicists and engineers in medicine. The IAPM was founded in 2010 by the merger of the Association of Physical Scientists in Medicine and the Irish Radiotherapy Physics Group. The aims of the Association are as follows:

 The promotion of the application of the physical sciences in medicine.
 Establishing and maintaining professional standards.
 Promoting professional development and the interests of the membership.

See also
 Institute of Physics and Engineering in Medicine
 American Association of Physicists in Medicine
 International Organization for Medical Physics
 European Federation of Organisations for Medical Physics

External links 
 Official website of the IAPM

Medical physics organizations
Learned societies of Ireland
Professional associations based in Ireland
2010 establishments in Ireland
Scientific organizations established in 2010